Sarojini Naidu (13 February 1879 – 2 March 1949) was an Indian political activist and poet. A proponent of civil rights, women's emancipation, and anti-imperialism, she played an important role in the Indian independence movement against the British Raj. She was the first Indian woman to be president of the Indian National Congress and to be appointed governor of a state.

Born in a Bengali family in Hyderabad, Naidu was educated in Madras, London and Cambridge. Following her time in Britain, where she worked as a suffragist, she was drawn to the Congress party's struggle for India's independence. She became a part of the national movement and became a follower of Mahatma Gandhi and his idea of swaraj (self rule). She was appointed Congress president in 1925 and, when India achieved its independence, became Governor of the United Provinces in 1947.

Naidu's literary work as a poet earned her the nickname the "Nightingale of India" by Gandhi because of the colour, imagery and lyrical quality of her poetry. Her oeuvre includes both children's poems and others written on more serious themes including patriotism and tragedy. Published in 1912, "In the Bazaars of Hyderabad" remains one of her most popular poems.

Personal life 
Sarojini Naidu was born in Hyderabad on 13 February 1879 to Aghorenath Chattopadhyay and Varada Sundari Devi. Her parental home was at Brahmangaon Bikrampur, Dhaka, Bengal province (present-day in Bangladesh). Her father was a Bengali Brahmin and the principal of Nizam College. He held a doctorate of Science from Edinburgh University. Her mother wrote poetry in Bengali.

She was the eldest of the eight siblings. Her brother Virendranath Chattopadhyay was a revolutionary, and another brother Harindranath was a poet, a dramatist, and an actor. Their family was well-regarded in Hyderabad.

Education 

Chattopadhyay passed her matriculation examination to qualify for university study, earning the highest rank, in 1891, when she was twelve. From 1895 to 1898 she studied in England, at King's College, London and then Girton College, Cambridge, with a scholarship from the Nizam of Hyderabad. In England, she met artists from the Aesthetic and Decadent movements. She travelled briefly in Europe.

Marriage 

Chattopadhyay returned to Hyderabad in 1898. That same year, she married Govindaraju Naidu, a physician,-whom she met during her stay in England, in an  marriage which has been called "groundbreaking and scandalous". Both their families approved their marriage, which was long and harmonious. They had five children. Their daughter Padmaja also joined the Quit India Movement, and she held several governmental positions in independent India.

Political career

Early oratory
Beginning in 1904, Naidu became an increasingly popular orator, promoting Indian independence and women's rights, especially women's education. Her oratory often framed arguments following the five-part rhetorical structures of Nyaya reasoning. She addressed the Indian National Congress and the Indian Social Conference in Calcutta in 1906. Her social work for flood relief earned her the Kaisar-i-Hind Medal in 1911, which she later returned in protest over the April 1919 Jallianwala Bagh massacre.  She met Muthulakshmi Reddy in 1909, and in 1914 she met Mahatma Gandhi, whom she credited with inspiring a new commitment to political action. She was the second woman President of the Indian National Congress and first Indian woman to preside over the INC conference .

With Reddy, she helped established the Women's Indian Association in 1917. Later that year, Naidu accompanied her colleague Annie Besant, who was the president of Home Rule League and Women's Indian Association, to advocate universal suffrage in front of the Joint Select Committee in London, United Kingdom.She also supported the Lucknow Pact, a joint  Hindu–Muslim demand for British political reform, at the Madras Special Provincial Council. As a public speaker, Naidu's oratory was known for its personality and its incorporation of her poetry.

Nonviolent resistance 
Naidu formed close ties with Gandhi, Gopal Krishna Gokhale, Rabindranath Tagore and Sarala Devi Chaudhurani. After 1917, she joined Gandhi's satyagraha movement of nonviolent resistance against British rule. Naidu went to London in 1919 as a part of the All India Home Rule League as a part of her continued efforts to advocate for freedom from the British rule. The next year, she participated in the non-cooperation movement in India.

In 1924, Naidu represented the Indian National Congress at the East African Indian National Congress. In 1925, Naidu was the first female president of the Indian National Congress. In 1927, Naidu was a founding member of the All India Women's Conference. In 1928, she travelled in the United States to promote nonviolent resistance. Naidu also presided over East African and Indian Congress' 1929 session in South Africa.

In 1930, Gandhi initially did not want to permit women to join the Salt March, because it would be physically demanding with a high risk of arrest. Naidu and other female activists, including Kamaladevi Chattopadhyay and Khurshed Naoroji, persuaded him otherwise, and joined the march. When Gandhi was arrested on 6 April 1930, he appointed Naidu as the new leader of the campaign.

The Indian National Congress decided to stay away from the First Round Table Conference that took place in London owing to the arrests. In 1931, however, Naidu and other leaders of the Congress Party participated in the Second Round Table Conference headed by Viceroy Lord Irwin in the wake of the Gandhi-Irwin pact. Naidu was jailed by the British in 1932.

The British jailed Naidu again in 1942 for her participation in the Quit India Movement. She was imprisoned for 21 months.

Governor of United Provinces
Following India's independence from the British rule in 1947, Naidu was appointed the governor of the United Provinces (present-day Uttar Pradesh), making her India's first woman governor. She remained in office until her death in March 1949 (aged 70).

Writing career
Naidu began writing at the age of 12. Her play, Maher Muneer, written in Persian, impressed the Nizam of Kingdom of Hyderabad.

Naidu's poetry was written in english
, and usually took the form of lyric poetry in the tradition of British Romanticism, which she was sometimes challenged to reconcile with her Indian nationalist politics. She was known for her vivid use of rich sensory images in her writing, and for her lush depictions of India. She was well-regarded as a poet, considered the "Indian Yeats". ସରିଛି

Her first book of poems was published in London in 1905, titled "The Golden Threshold". The publication was suggested by Edmund Gosse, and bore an introduction by Arthur Symons. It also included a sketch of Naidu as a teenager, in a ruffled white dress, drawn by John Butler Yeats. Her second and most strongly nationalist book of poems, The Bird of Time, was published in 1912. It was published in both London and New York, and includes "In the Bazaars of Hyderabad". The last book of new poems published in her lifetime, The Broken Wing (1917).It includes the poem "The Gift of India", critiquing the British empire's exploitation of Indian mothers and soldiers, which she had previously recited to the Hyderabad Ladies' War Relief Association in 1915. It also includes "Awake!", which was dedicated to MA Jinnah and with which she concluded a 1915 speech to the Indian National Congress to urge unified Indian action. A collection of all her published poems was printed in New York in 1928. After her death, Naidu's complete poems, including unpublished works, were collected in The Feather of the Dawn (1961), edited by her daughter Padmaja Naidu.

Naidu's speeches were first collected and published in January 1918 as The Speeches and Writings of Sarojini Naidu, a popular publication which led to an expanded reprint in 1919 and again in 1925.

Works
 1905: The Golden Threshold, London: William Heineman
 1915: The Bird of Time: Songs of Life, Death & the Spring, London: William Heineman and New York: John Lane Company
 1919: The Broken Wing: Songs of Love, Death and the Spring
 1919: "The Song of the Palanquin Bearers", lyrics by Naidu and music by Martin Shaw, London: Curwen
 1920: The Speeches and Writings of Sarojini Naidu, Madras: G.A. Natesan & Co.
 1922: Editor, Muhammad Ali Jinnah, An Ambassador of Unity: His Speeches & Writings 1912–1917, with a biographical "Pen Portrait" of Jinnah by Naidu, Madras: Ganesh & Co.
 1948: The Sceptred Flute: Songs of India, New York: Dodd, Mead, & Co.
 1961: The Feather of the Dawn, edited by Padmaja Naidu, Bombay: Asia Publishing House

Death

Naidu died of cardiac arrest at 3:30 p.m. (IST) on 2 March 1949 at the Government House in Lucknow. Upon her return from New Delhi on 15 February, she was advised to rest by her doctors, and all official engagements were canceled. Her health deteriorated substantially and bloodletting was performed on the night of 1 March after she complained of severe headache. She collapsed following a fit of cough. Naidu was said to have asked the nurse attending to her to sing to her at about 10:40 p.m. (IST) which put her to sleep. She subsequently died, and her last rites were performed at the Gomati River.

Legacy 
Naidu is known as "one of India's feminist luminaries". Naidu's birthday, 13 February, is celebrated as Women's Day to recognise powerful voices of women in India's history.

Composer Helen Searles Westbrook (1889–1967) set Naidu's text to music in her song "Invincible."

As a poet, Naidu was known as the "Nightingale of India". Edmund Gosse called her "the most accomplished living poet in India" in 1919.

Naidu is memorialized in the Golden Threshold, an off-campus annex of University of Hyderabad named for her first collection of poetry. Golden Threshold now houses the Sarojini Naidu School of Arts & Communication in the University of Hyderabad.

Asteroid 5647 Sarojininaidu, discovered by Eleanor Helin at Palomar Observatory in 1990, was named in her memory. The official  was published by the Minor Planet Center on 27 August 2019.

In 2014, Google India commemorated Naidu's 135th birth anniversary with a Google Doodle.

Works about Naidu 
The first biography of Naidu, Sarojini Naidu: a Biography by Padmini Sengupta, was published in 1966. A biography for children, Sarojini Naidu: The Nightingale and The Freedom Fighter, was published by Hachette in 2014.

In 1975, the Government of India Films Division produced a twenty-minute documentary about Naidu's life, "Sarojini Naidu – The Nightingale of India", directed by Bhagwan Das Garga.

In 2020, a biopic was announced, titled Sarojini, to be directed by Akash Nayak and Dhiraj Mishra, and starring Dipika Chikhlia as Naidu.

See also

 Indian English literature
 Indian literature
 Indian poetry
 Indian poetry in English
 List of Indian poets
 List of Indian writers

References

Further reading

External links

 Nightingale of India: a Sarojini Naidu biopic
 The poetry of Sarojini Naidu: A fusion of English language and Indian culture
 
 
 The Golden Threshold in The Internet Archive
 
 Biography and Poems of Sarojini Naidu 
 Letter written by Sarojini Naidu 
 Sarojini Naidu: An introduction to her life, work, and poetry By Vishwanath S. Naravane
 Sarojini Naidu materials at the South Asian American Digital Archive (SAADA)
 

1879 births
1949 deaths
19th-century Indian poets
19th-century Indian politicians
19th-century Indian women politicians
19th-century Indian women writers
20th-century Bengali poets
20th-century Indian poets
20th-century Indian politicians
20th-century Indian women politicians
20th-century Indian women writers
Alumni of Girton College, Cambridge
Alumni of King's College London
Bengali female poets
Bengali Hindus
Brahmos
English-language poets from India
Indian National Congress politicians from Telangana
Indian tax resisters
Indian women poets
People from Bikrampur
People from Hyderabad, India
Presidents of the Indian National Congress
Women in Telangana politics
Women in Uttar Pradesh politics
Women Indian independence activists
Women state governors of India
Women writers from Telangana
Indian suffragists
Indian feminists
Indian independence activists from Telangana
Recipients of the Kaisar-i-Hind Medal
Sarojini Naidu